Josep María "Pep" Chavarría Pérez (born 10 April 1998) is a Spanish professional footballer who plays for Rayo Vallecano as a left-back.

Career

Early career
Chavarría was born in Figueres, Girona, Catalonia, and finished his formation with UE Figueres. On 10 September 2016, aged just 18, he made his first team debut by playing the last 11 minutes of a 0–4 Tercera División away loss against CF Peralada.

On 10 July 2018, after becoming a starter for Figueres, Chavarría moved to Segunda División B side UE Olot. He scored his first senior goal on 10 November 2018, netting the opener in a 2–1 away win against Villarreal CF B.

Zaragoza
On 25 August 2020, Chavarría agreed to a four-year contract with Real Zaragoza in Segunda División. He made his professional debut on 26 September, starting in a 2–2 home draw against UD Las Palmas.

Chavarría scored his first professional goal on 19 December 2020, netting the winner in a 1–0 home success over CD Lugo.

Rayo Vallecano
On 31 August 2022, Chavarría signed a five-year deal with La Liga side Rayo Vallecano.

References

External links

1998 births
Living people
People from Figueres
Sportspeople from the Province of Girona
Spanish footballers
Footballers from Catalonia
Association football fullbacks
Segunda División players
Segunda División B players
Tercera División players
UE Figueres footballers
UE Olot players
Real Zaragoza players
Rayo Vallecano players
Spain youth international footballers